John Redwood Anderson (1883 – 29 March 1964) was an English poet and playwright. His play Babel was staged on several occasions.

Life
Anderson was born in Salford and educated at home and at Trinity College, Oxford. After travelling, he settled as a teacher in Kingston-upon-Hull.

Anderson's play Babel was staged several times, and published by Ernest Benn in 1927. It reappeared in 1936 in a revised stage version as The Tower to Heaven by the Oxford University Press.

In 1953 his wife, Gwyneth's aunt Rachel Barrett died. She had been a leading suffragette and left her Essex home, Lamb Cottage in Sible Hedingham, to her niece.

Anderson died at his home in Sible Hedingham on 29 March 1964; he was 81.

Works
The Music of Death (1904)
The Legend of Eros and Psyche (1908)
The Mask (1912)
Flemish Tales (1913)
Walls and Hedges (1919)
Haunted Islands (1923/4)
Babel (1927) verse drama
The Vortex (1928)
Standing Waters (1929) (poetry - pamphlet)
Transvaluations (1932)
The Human Dawn (1934)
English Fantasies (1935)
The Tower to Heaven (1936)
The Curlew Cries (1940)
The Principle of Uniformity in English Metre (1941) (criticism - pamphlet)
Approach (1946)
The Fugue of Time (1946)
Paris Symphony (1947)
An Ascent (1947)
Pillars to Remembrance (1948)
Almanac (1956) 
While Fates Allow (1962)
Poems of the Evening (1971)

References
Poems of Today, Third Series, compiled by the English Association (1938), p. xxi

External links

Second-hand titles

Notes

1883 births
1964 deaths
20th-century English male writers
20th-century English poets
Writers from Manchester
English male poets
People from Salford
Alumni of Trinity College, Oxford
People from Kingston upon Hull